Passione is the second album by British singer Paul Potts. It was released on 13 April 2009 in New Zealand, on 5 May 2009 in the US and on 1 June 2009 in the UK. Potts spent nearly a year recording Passione in Prague and Stockholm.

Track listing

Charts
The album debuted at number one in New Zealand on 20 April 2009. It was certified Gold in its first week, selling over 7,500 copies. It debuted at number 10 in Canada (number one on the classical charts) on 5 May 2009. The album entered the UK Albums Chart on 7 June 2009 at number 5,

Certifications

References

External links

2009 albums
Paul Potts albums
Columbia Records albums
Syco Music albums
Classical crossover albums